"Absolutely Fabulous" is a song by English synth-pop duo Pet Shop Boys, released as a single for 1994's Comic Relief under the artist name "Absolutely Fabulous"; it is based on the BBC sitcom of the same name created by Jennifer Saunders and features sound bites taken from the first series of the show. The single peaked at number six on the UK Singles Chart and number seven on the US Billboard Hot Dance Club Play chart. It was more successful in Oceania, debuting and peaking at number two in both Australia and New Zealand; in the former country, it is the band's highest-charting single, and in both, it was their last top-10 entry.

Critical reception
In his weekly UK chart commentary, James Masterton wrote, "It is ostensibly a comedy record but few comedy records claim to possess as much dancefloor credibility as this one." He added, "Now its stars, Jennifer Saunders and Joanna Lumley team up with the Pet Shop Boys to make this dance track, interspersed with sampled dialogue from the TV series along with various posturings from Edina and Patsy of which 'Techno Techno Bloody Techno Darling!' is possibly a highlight..." Pan-European magazine Music & Media described it as "a Pet Shop electro popper". Alan Jones from Music Week rated it five out of five and named it Single of the Week, adding, "The Pet Shop Boys have done a splendid job assembling some memorable snippets from the TV series' Patsy and Edina over a relentless disco beat. All profits from the single – which are likely to be considerable – go to Comic Relief. A potential number one."

Music video
The accompanying music video features the Pet Shop Boys performing while Absolutely Fabulous characters Edina and Patsy (Jennifer Saunders and Joanna Lumley) dance around them. Clips from the first two original TV series are interspersed throughout the video.

Releases
Apart from its release as a single, the song "Absolutely Fabulous" also appears on the "Further Listening" disc that came with the 2001 reissue of the Pet Shop Boys album Very. The music video clip of the song features on Pet Shop Boys' video compilation Various, available on VHS, as well as on the AbFab DVD collection of series one through three. The Our Tribe Tongue-In-Cheek Mix version of the song features on the band's Disco 2 album.

Track listings

 UK and Australian CD single
 "Absolutely Fabulous" (7-inch mix)
 "Absolutely Fabulous" (Our Tribe Tongue-in-Cheek mix)
 "Absolutely Dubulous"
 "Absolutely Fabulous" (Dull Soulless Dance Music mix)

 Withdrawn UK CD single
 "Absolutely Fabulous" (7-inch mix)
 "Absolutely Fabulous" (Our Tribe Tongue-in-Cheek mix)
 "Absolutely Dubulous"
 "This Wheel's on Fire"

This CD was withdrawn due to copyright legalities for "This Wheel's on Fire".

 UK 7-inch and cassette single
 "Absolutely Fabulous" (7-inch mix)
 "Absolutely Fabulous" (Dull Soulless Dance Music mix)

 UK 12-inch single
A1. "Absolutely Fabulous" (Our Tribe Tongue-in-Cheek mix)
A2. "Absolutely Dubulous"
B1. "Absolutely Fabulous" (7-inch mix)
B2. "Absolutely Fabulous" (Dull Soulless Dance Music mix)

Charts

Weekly charts

Year-end charts

Certifications

References

1994 singles
1994 songs
Absolutely Fabulous
Comic Relief singles
Music based on television series
Parlophone singles
Pet Shop Boys songs
Songs written by Chris Lowe
Songs written by Neil Tennant